HK Liepāja are a Latvian ice hockey team that plays in the Optibet Hockey League, the top tier of the sport in Latvia. The team is based in Liepāja and play their home games at the Liepājas Olimpiskā Centra ice hall.

History
Hokeja Klubs Liepāja was founded in 2014, following the collapse of the previous team in the city; HK Liepājas Metalurgs folded as a result of their title sponsor, Liepājas Metalurgs, pulling funding as a result of financial difficulties steming from the Great Recession. Several months later, the company would declare themselves insolvent. The eight Latvian championships won by won HK Liepājas Metalurgs is, as of February 2021, the most won by any team. 

HK Liepāja began play in the 2014–15 Latvian Hockey League season and immediately assembled a strong side, finishing 2nd in the regular season before losing in the play-offs semi-finals to HK Kurbads. They would pick up a medal however, as they beat HK Zemgale in the bronze medal game. The team fared even better in their second season, finishing 1st in the regular season, before going on to claim the Latvian championship by beating HK Kurbads in the play-off final. The following season saw Liepāja finish 4th overall, before losing in the play-off semi-finals to HK Mogo. The 2017-18 season saw the team improve in the regular season, finishing 2nd, however, they again losing in the play-off semi-finals to Kurbads, who would ultimately go on to win the league. In the off-season the team parted ways with Head Coach Igors Ļebedevs, who subsequently joined HK Zemgale as an Assistant Coach, and replaced him with Maksims Bogdanovs. Under their new coach, Liepāja's fortunes worsened, finishing the 2018-19 season in 5th place, causing them to miss out on the play-offs for the first year since their inception. The 2019-20 season saw the team finish in 4th place before the play-offs were cancelled due to the COVID-19 pandemic. In the off-season, Bogdanovs was replaced with former KHL Head Coach and General Manager Normunds Sējējs.

Due to winning the Latvian league in 2016, the team qualified for the 2016–17 IIHF Continental Cup, where they were drawn in Group B alongside Turkish side Zeytinburnu Belediyespor, CH Jaca of Spain, and British champions Nottingham Panthers. HK Liepāja would comfortably beat both CH Jaca and Zeytinburnu Belediyespor before losing their final game against the Panthers. As a result, Liepāja finished 2nd in their group, and did not progress any further in the comeptition. The Panthers, who finished Group B in 1st place, would ultimately go on to win the Continental Cup.

In 2020 HK Liepāja took place in the inaugural Baltic Hockey League, a competition made up of two teams from each of Estonia, Latvia and Lithuania. Liepāja represented Latvia alongside compatriots HK Mogo.They went on to win their group, beating both Estonian outfit HC Everest, and Hockey Punks Vilnius of Lithuania. As a result they progressed to the final round, due initially to take place in December 2020, however, this was postponed until February 2021 as a result of several HK Mogo players having been exposed to COVID-19. In early February the final round was again postponed due to the pandemic, with the date to be announced when the Covid situation improves.

Roster
Updated February 17, 2021.

Season-by-season record
Note: GP = Games played, W = Wins, L = Losses, T = Ties, OTL = Overtime losses, Pts = Points, GF = Goals for, GA = Goals against, PIM = Penalties in minutes

Honours
Latvian Championships:
 2016

Team records

Career
These are the top five scorers in HK Liepāja history.

''Note: Pos = Position; GP = Games played; G = Goals; A = Assists; Pts = Points

Penalty minutes: Dmitrijs Korņilovs, 214

Season

Regular season 
 Most goals in a season: Mark Kaleinikovas, 26 (2019-20)
 Most assists in a season: Bruno Zabis, 37 (2014-15)
 Most points in a season: Bruno Zabis, 58 (2014-15)
 Most penalty minutes in a season: Dmitrijs Korņilovs, 117 (2015–16)

Playoffs 
 Most goals in a playoff season: Egils Kalns, 8 (2015–16)
 Most assists in a playoff season: Bruno Zabis, 12 (2015–16)
 Most points in a playoff season: Bruno Zabis, 19 (2015–16)
 Most penalty minutes in a playoff season: Dmitrijs Korņilovs, 46 (2014–15)

Notable players
 Roberts Bukarts
 Mārtiņš Dzierkals
 Māris Jučers
 Dmitri Pestunov

Notable coaches
 Normunds Sējējs

References

External links
 HK Liepāja
 

Ice hockey clubs established in 2014
Latvian Hockey League teams
2014 establishments in Latvia
Sport in Liepāja
Ice hockey teams in Latvia